The year 2003 is the fifth year in the history of King of the Cage, a mixed martial arts promotion based in the United States. In 2003 King of the Cage held 11 events, KOTC 21: Invasion.

Title fights

Events list

KOTC 21: Invasion

KOTC 21: Invasion was an event held on February 21, 2003 at the Santa Ana Star Hotel & Casino in Albuquerque, New Mexico, United States.

Results

KOTC 22: Steel Warrior

KOTC 22: Steel Warrior was an event held on March 23, 2003 at the Soboba Casino in San Jacinto, California, United States.

Results

KOTC 23: Sin City

KOTC 23: Sin City was an event held on May 16, 2003 at the Orleans Hotel Casino in Las Vegas, Nevada, United States.

Results

KOTC 24: Mayhem

KOTC 24: Mayhem was an event held on June 14, 2003 in Albuquerque, New Mexico, United States.

Results

KOTC 25: Flaming Fury

KOTC 25: Flaming Fury was an event held on June 29, 2003 at the Soboba Casino in San Jacinto, California, United States.

Results

KOTC 26: Gladiator Challenge

KOTC 26: Gladiator Challenge was an event held on August 3, 2003 at the Sky City Casino in Acoma, New Mexico, United States.

Results

KOTC 27: Aftermath

KOTC 27: Aftermath was an event held on August 10, 2003 at the Saboba Casino in San Jacinto, California, United States.

Results

KOTC 28: More Punishment

KOTC 28: More Punishment was an event held on August 16, 2003 in Reno, Nevada, United States.

Results

KOTC 29: Renegades

KOTC 29: Renegades was an event held on September 5, 2003 at the Soboba Casino in San Jacinto, California, United States.

Results

KOTC 30: The Pinnacle

KOTC 30: The Pinnacle was an event held on November 12, 2003 at the Pala Casino Spa Resort in Pala, California, United States.

Results

KOTC 31: King of the Cage 31

KOTC 31: King of the Cage 31 was an event held on December 6, 2003 at the Soboba Casino in San Jacinto, California, United States.

Results

See also 
 King of the Cage
 List of King of the Cage events
 List of King of the Cage champions

References

King of the Cage events
2003 in mixed martial arts